The 2013  the Marina Bay GP2 Series round was the tenth and penultimate round of the  2013 GP2 Series. It was held on 21 and 22 September 2013 at Marina Bay Street Circuit in Marina Bay, Singapore. The race supported the 2013 Singapore Grand Prix.

Classification

Qualifying

Feature race

Sprint race

Notes

References

Marina Bay
GP2